Beak 2 (stylized >> or Beak>>) is the second studio album by the British band Beak, released on 2 July 2012.

Track listing

Personnel
Matt Williams — guitars, organ, synthesizers
Billy Fuller — bass, vocals; synthesizer (tracks 6, 8)
Geoff Barrow — drums, vocals; synthesizer (tracks 5, 6)

Accolades

References

2012 albums
Albums produced by Geoff Barrow